Estouteville-Écalles is a former commune in the Seine-Maritime department in the region of Normandy, France. On 1 January 2017, it was merged into the commune Buchy.

Geography

Population

Places of interest
 Three churches, in the three parts of the commune, dating from the seventeenth century.
 Evidence of a mediaeval fortress.

See also
Communes of the Seine-Maritime department

References

External links

 Website of the committee des fêtes d'Estouteville Ecalles 

Former communes of Seine-Maritime